Arne Storhaug (born 27 September 1950) is a Norwegian politician for the Labour Party.

He served as a deputy representative to the Norwegian Parliament from Telemark during the terms 2001–2005 and 2005–2009.

On the local level Storhaug has been the mayor of Bø since 1995 until 2011.

References

1950 births
Living people
Deputy members of the Storting
Labour Party (Norway) politicians
Mayors of places in Telemark
Place of birth missing (living people)
21st-century Norwegian politicians